The Ivorian Human Rights League (LIDHO) is a human rights organization in Côte d'Ivoire, founded on 21 March 1987 by René Degni-Segui. LIDHO is present in almost all major cities in Côte d'Ivoire.

See also
Politics of Côte d'Ivoire
Universal Declaration of Human Rights

References
  LIDHO.org

Human rights organizations based in Ivory Coast